Ctenucha palmeira is a moth of the family Erebidae. It was described by William Schaus in 1892. It is found in Rio de Janeiro, Brazil.

References

palmeira
Moths described in 1892